Harrisia tortuosa is a species of cactus in the Trichocereeae tribe.

It is native to the tropical Americas.

Harrisia tortuosa is considered an exotic invasive in Australia.

References

tortuosa
Cacti of North America
Cacti of South America
Flora of the Caribbean
Flora without expected TNC conservation status